This is a list of ancient tribes in the ancient territory of Illyria. The name Illyrians seems to be the name of a single Illyrian tribe that was the first to come into contact with the ancient Greeks, causing the name Illyrians to be applied to all people of similar language and customs. The locations of Illyrian tribes/peoples prior to the Roman conquest are approximate, as sometimes many wholly different locations are given by ancient writers and modern authors (as in the case of the Enchelei).

After the Great Illyrian Revolt, the Romans deported, split, and resettled Illyrian tribes within Illyria itself and to Dacia, sometimes causing whole tribes to vanish and new ones to be formed from their remains, such as the Deraemestae and the Docleatae, some of them mixed with Celtic tribes (see Celticization). Many tribal names are known from Roman  and the number of their , formed of the dispersed tribes in Illyria.

Illyrian

Albani

They were the citizens of Albanopolis, located in the center of modern Albania, in the Zgërdhesh hill fort, near the city of Krujë. The national ethnonym of the Albanians is derived from this tribe.

Amantes

The Amantes lived in present-day southwestern Albania. The site of Amantia has been identified with the location of their territory. The toponym has a connection with the modern Albanian term amë/ãmë ("river-bed, fountain, spring")

Ardiaei

The Ardiaei or Ouardaioi were an Illyrian tribe, residing inland, that eventually settled on the Adriatic coast. The Ardiaei had 20 . The Ardiaean dynasty ruled over the Illyrian Kingdom.

Autariatae

The Autariatae or Autariates were an Illyrian tribe that became prominent between the 6th and 4th centuries BC. The tribe had been Celticized.

Balaites

The Balaites were an Illyrian tribe known from epigraphical findings only who were organizing themselves in a koinon, and it is likely that they lived in the vicinity of Apollonia.

Bathiatae
The Bathiatae were an Illyrian tribe.

Bylliones

The Bylliones were an Illyrian tribe. They were affected by a partial cultural Hellenisation. According to Robert Elsie, the tribe was Illyrian.

Cavii

The Cavii were an Illyrian tribe. They lived close to Lake Shkodër. Their main settlement was Epicaria. They are mentioned rarely by ancient writers.

Daorsi

The Daorsi or Duersi or Daorsii or Daorsei were an Illyrian tribe. Another name of the tribe was Daversi. The Daorsi had suffered attacks from the Delmatae that made them along with Issa seek the aid of the Roman state. The Daorsi fought on the Roman side, providing them with their strong navy abandoning Caravantius. After the Illyrian Wars, the Daorsi were given immunity. Their most important city was Daorson. They had 17 .

Dardani

The Dardani or Dardanians were a tribe located at the Thraco-Illyrian contact zone and their identification is uncertain. Johann Georg von Hahn was the first to propose that the names Dardanoi and Dardania were related to the Albanian word dardhë ("pear, pear-tree"). Subgroups of the Dardani include the Galabri and the Thunatae.

Dassaretii

The Dassaretii were an Illyrian tribe. They were located between the Dardani and the Ardiaei. Appian of Alexandria wrote in his Illyrian wars that according to the Ancient Greeks, Illyrius, the ancestor of the Illyrians, had a daughter, Dassaro, from whom sprang the Dassaretii. They are not to be confused with the ancient Greek Dexaroi the Lake Ohrid region.

Deretini
The Deretini or Derriopes were an Illyrian tribe in Narona conventus with 14 .

Deuri
The Deuri or Derbanoi were an Illyrian tribe. Other possible names are Derrioi. In a conventus held in Salona after the Roman conquest the Deuri had 25 .

Dyestes
The Dyestes or Dyestae were an Illyrian tribe located around the silver mines of Damastion. Only Strabo passingly mentions this tribe.

Enchelei

The Enchelei or Sesarethii (accusative of ) were an Illyrian tribe. Their name, given by the Greeks, meant "eel-men". In Greek mythology. According to E. Hamp, a connection with Albanian ngjalë makes it possible that the name Enchele was derived from the Illyrian term for eels Cadmus and Harmonia ruled over them. Several locations are hypothesized for the Encheleans: around Lake Ohrid; above Lake Ohrid, or in the region of Lynkestis south of the Taulantii.

Kinambroi
The Kinambroi were an Illyrian tribe. They surrendered to Octavian in 33 BC.

Labeatae

The Labeates or Labeatae were an Illyrian tribe that lived (after being defeated by Parmenio) around Scodra.

Mazaei

The Mazaei or Maezaei were a tribal group, including 269 .

Melcumani
The Melcumani or Merromenoi or Melkomenioi were an Illyrian tribe. The Melcumani had 24 .

Narensi
Narensi or Narensii or Narensioi or Naresioi or Naresii was the name of a newly formed Illyrian tribe from various peoples living around the River Naron or Neretva, mostly in its Lower course. The Narensi had 102 .

Parthini

Penestae

Penestae was the name of an Illyrian tribe. Their chief town was Uscana.

Selepitani
The Selepitani (Latin: Selepitani) were an Illyrian tribe located below the Lake Scutari.

Siculotae

The Siculotae or Sikoulotai were an Illyrian tribe. The Siculotae were part of the Pirustae. The Siculotae had 24 .

Dalmatae

The Dalmatae were an ancient Illyrian tribe. It is considered to be connected to the Albanian dele and its variants which include the Gheg form delmë, meaning "sheep", and to the Albanian term delmer, "shepherd". They were later Celticized. The Delmatae had 342 .

Iapydes

The Iapydes or Japodes were an ancient people who dwelt north of and inland from the Liburnians, off the Adriatic coast and eastwards of the Istrian peninsula. The first written mention of an Illyrian tribe known as "Iapydes" is by Hecataeus of Miletus.

Baridustae

The Baridustae were an Illyrian tribe that was later settled in Dacia along with Pirustae and Sardeates. The Baridustae were a Dalmatian tribe.

Tariotes

The Tariotes were a subtribe of the Dalmatae that lived on the eastern Adriatic coast.

Sardiatae

The Sardeates or Sardiotai were an Illyrian tribe close to Jajce. Sardeates were later settled in Dacia. The Sardeates had 52 .

Docleatae
The Docleatae were an Illyrian tribe that lived in what is now Montenegro. Their capital was Doclea (or Dioclea), and they are called after the town. They had settled west of the Morača river, up to Montenegro's present-day borders with Bosnia and Herzegovina. The Docleatae were prominent for their cheese, which was exported to various Roman provinces within the Roman Empire. They were composed of parts of the Taulantii, the Pleraei or Pyraei, Endirudini, Sasaei, Grabaei, Labeatae that came together after the Great Illyrian revolt. The Docleatae had 33 .

Pleraei
Pleraei, Plarioi, Pyraei, Pleraioi, Plaraioi or Palarioi was the name of an Illyrian tribe.

Endirudini
Endirudini or Interphrourinoi was the name of an Illyrian tribe that became part of the Docleatae.

Sasaei
Sasaei was the name of an Illyrian tribe that became part of the Docleatae.

Grabaei

The Grabaei or Kambaioi were a minor Illyrian group that lived around Lake Scutari.

Deraemestae
Deraemestae or Deraemistae was the name of an Illyrian tribe. The Deraemestae were composed of parts of several other tribes such as the Ozuaei, Taulantii, Partheni, Hemasini, Arthitae and Armistae. The Deramestae had 30 .

Oxuaioi
Ozuaei or Ozuaioi or Oxuaioi was the name of one of the tribes comprising the Deramestae.

Hemasini
Hemasini or Hippasinoi was the name of one of the tribes comprising the Deramestae.

Arthitae
Arthitae was the name of one of the tribes comprising the Deramestae.

Armistae
Armistae was the name of one of the tribes comprising the Deramestae.

Taulantii

Taulantii was the name of a cluster of Illyrian tribes. The term taulantii is connected with the Albanian word dallëndyshe, or tallandushe, meaning 'swallow'. The ethnonym Chelidonioi also reported by Hecateus as the name of a tribe neighboring the Taulantii is the translation of the name Taulantii as khelīdṓn (χελιδών) means "swallow" in Ancient Greek. According to Greek mythology Taulas (Tαύλας), one of the six sons of Illyrius, was the eponymous ancestor of the Taulantii. They lived on the Adriatic coast of Illyria, between to the vicinity of the city of Epidamnus (modern Durrës in Albania). This tribe played an important role in Illyrian history of the 4th-3rd centuries BC, when King Glaukias (ruled 335 – c. 302 BC) ruled over them. This tribe had become bilingual being under the effects of an early Hellenisation. Taulantii could prepare mead, wine from honey like the Abri.

Chelidonioi

Abroi

Pannonian tribes

The name Pannonians refers to Illyrian tribes, who originally inhabited the southern part of what was later known as Roman province of Pannonia, south of the river Drava, and the northern part of the future Roman province of Dalmatia. In the Roman era, Pannonians settled in Dacia, the northern Pannonian plain and the eastern Alps. Some Pannonian tribes appear to have been Celticized.

The Pannonians were not definitely subdued within the province of Illyricum until the Great Illyrian Revolt, which started in 6 AD when the Pannonians, together with the Dalmatians and other Illyrian tribes, revolted, and engaged the Roman Empire in a hard-fought campaign that lasted for three years, when they were finally overcome by the future emperor Tiberius and Germanicus in 9 AD. At that point, the province of Illyricum was dissolved, and its lands were divided between the new provinces of Pannonia in the north and Dalmatia in the south. The date of the division is unknown, most certainly after 20 AD but before 50 AD.

The Pannonian tribes inhabited the area between the river Drava and the Dalmatian coast. Early archaeology and onomastics show that they were culturally different from southern Illyrians, Iapodes, and the La Tène peoples commonly known as the Celts, though they were later Celticized. However, there are some cultural similarities between the Pannonians and Dalmatians. Many of the Pannonians lived in areas with rich iron ore deposits, so that iron mining and production was an important part of their economy before and after the Roman conquest. Apart from Segestica, the Pannonians did not have settlements of importance in pre-Roman times that were actually Celtic. Ancient sources (Strabo, Pliny the Elder, Appian of Alexandria) mention few of the Pannonian tribes by name, and historians and archaeologists have located some of them. Those tribes were:

Amantini

Amantini was the name of a Pannonian Illyrian tribe. They greatly resisted the Romans but were sold as slaves after their defeat. The Amantini were close to Sirmium.

Breuci
The Breuci were a Pannonian Illyrian tribe. They greatly resisted the Romans and some were sold as slaves after their defeat. They received Roman citizenship during Trajan's rule. It is likely that the name of the northern Bosnian city Brčko is derived from the name of this tribe. A number of Breuci settled in Dacia.

Bato the Breucian of the Breuci tribe and Pinnes from Pannonia were among the leaders of the Great Illyrian Revolt, together with Bato the Daesitiate of the Daesitiates from Dalmatia.

Colapiani
Colapiani was the name of an Illyrian tribe. The Colapiani were created from the Pannonian Breuci along with the Osseriates and the Celtic Varciani. They lived in the central and southern White Carniola, along the Kupa river, and were mentioned by Pliny the Elder and Ptolemy. The archeologists Jaro Šašel and Dragan Božič have attributed the Vinica material culture to Colapiani, but opinions are divided.

Daesitiates

The Daesitiates were an Illyrian tribe that lived in what is today central Bosnia and Herzegovina during the time of the Roman Republic. Along with the Maezaei, the Daesitiates were part of the western group of Pannonians in Roman Dalmatia. They were prominent from the end of the 4th century BC up until the beginning of the 3rd century AD. Evidence of their daily activities can be found in literary sources, as well as in the rich material finds that belong to the Central Bosnian cultural group. After nearly three centuries of political independence, the Daesitiates (and their polity) were conquered by Roman Emperor Augustus. Afterwards, the Daesitiates were incorporated into the province of Illyricum with a low total of 103 .

Pirustae
The Pirustae or Pyrissaei ( or ) were a Pannonian Illyrian tribe that lived in modern Montenegro. According to some sources, they had also lived in territories outside of modern-day Montenegro, but the majority of archaeologists, including the famous British archaeologist Sir Arthur Evans, say that the Pirustae had lived in northern Montenegro, around present-day Pljevlja and that they were prominent miners. Their prominence in mining has been seen in epigraphic monuments from Dacia's mining regions. Pirustae along with other Pannonians and Illyrians like the Sardeates were later settled in Dacia (modern-day Romania).

Scirtari
The Scirtari or Scirtones were an Illyrian tribe. The Scirtari were part of the Pirustae. The Scirtari had 72 .

Glintidiones
The Glintidiones were an Illyrian tribe. The Glintidiones may have been part of the Pirustae. The Glintidiones had 44 .

Ceraunii
Ceraunii was the name of an Illyrian tribe that lived close to the Pirustae in modern Montenegro. The Ceraunii were part of the Pirustae. They had 24 . Their name seems to derive from the Greek word for 'thunderbolt'.

Segestani
The Segestani were a Pannonian Illyrian tribe who inhabited the area around Segestica, later known as Siscia (modern-day Sisak in Croatia).

In the 2nd century BC, the Segestani were attacked without lasting success by consuls Lucius Aurelius Cotta and an unidentified Cornelius.

In 35 BC, the Segestani were attacked by Augustus, who conquered and occupied Siscia.

Maezaei

Maezaei or Maizaioi or Mazaioi were a Pannonian Illyrian tribe. The Maezaei had 269 .

Andizetes
The Andizetes, also referred to as Andisetes, were a small Pannonian tribe that lived in the territory of present-day Bosnia and Herzegovina. Not much is known about this tribe except that it is found on the list of Illyrian tribes that rose against the Roman Empire during the Great Illyrian Revolt. The personal name of 'Andes', a variant of the name 'Andis' popular among the Illyrians of southern Pannonia and much of northern Dalmatia (corresponding roughly with modern Bosnia and Herzegovina), may be derived from the name of this tribe. They started receiving Roman citizenship during Trajan's rule.

Azali

The Azali were a tribe that inhabited Brigetio (now Szőny) in Noricum, transported there during the Roman conquest from southern Pannonia. They had been deported after the 6–9 AD rebellion. They, along with the Eravisci, inhabited the Fejér County during the Marcomannic Wars (166–180). The civitas azaliorum included the Brigetio legionary fortress and surrounding settlements.

Ditiones
The Ditiones were a Pannonian Illyrian tribe. The Ditiones had 239 .

Jasi
Jasi was the name of a Pannonian Illyrian tribe.

Osseriates

The Osseriates (also Oseriates), along with the Celtic Varciani and the Colapiani, were created from the Pannonian Breuci.

Illyrii proprie dicti

Illyrii proprie dicti were the Illyrians proper, so called by Pliny (23–79 AD) in his Natural History. They later formed the Docleatae. They were the Taulantii, the Pleraei or Pyraei, the Endirudini, Sasaei, Grabaei, Labeatae. Illyrians proper were also some of the native communities of Roman Dalmatia.

Atintani

Atintani were a tribe in Illyria, north of Via Egnatia. Appian (95 – 165 AD) mentions them close to Epidamnus. During the Illyrian Wars, the Atintani went over to the Romans and, according to Appian, Demetrius of Pharos tried to detach them from Roman authority. The Atintani seem to have originated from the obscure, perhaps Thracian Tynteni, only attested in coins. The Atintani were ruled by the Thracian dynasty of the Peresadyes.

Greek
 See Greek colonies in Illyria

Liburnians

In the early historical sources from the 8th century BC, the Liburnians were recorded by name or as separate ethnic groups; and as early as the 6th century BC, Hecateus noted that the Liburnians were also composed of Caulici, Mentores, Syopii and Hythmitae, probably narrow tribal communities. Later, in the 3rd century BC, Callimachus mentioned Mentores, Hymanes, Enchealae and Peucetias as those who once had been a part of them, Ismeni were also recorded as one of their communities.
 Lopsi

Iapygians/Messapians

Iapygians and Messapians did not dwell in Illyria, but in the heel of southern Italy. They could have had Illyrian origins or some sort of link with Illyria.

Messapii
Dauni
Peucetii linked to the Liburnian Peucetias
Iapyges linked to the Iapodes, who were sometimes also called Iapyges

Adriatic Veneti

Histri
CatariSecusses

See also

Illyrian Tribes
List of ancient Cities in Illyria
List of ancient Cities in Thrace
List of ancient tribes in Thrace
List of rulers of Illyria
List of rulers of Thrace
List of Celtic tribes

References

Sources
 

Further reading
 Falileyev, Alexander and Radman-Livaja, Ivan. "More Celtic names from Roman Pannonia". In: Zeitschrift für celtische Philologie'' 63, no. 1 (2016): 49–68. https://doi.org/10.1515/zcph-2016-0004

Pannonians
Celtic tribes of Illyria
t
Illyrians